Henrysville is an unincorporated community in the Town of Eaton, Brown County, Wisconsin, United States. In May 1879, John Henry Osterloh opened a post office in the community.

References

Unincorporated communities in Brown County, Wisconsin
Unincorporated communities in Wisconsin
Green Bay metropolitan area